Pardessus can refer to:

 overcoat
 any descant instrument
 pardessus de viole, small version of viola da gamba
 Jean Marie Pardessus (1772–1853), French lawyer